Regenesis is Canadian youth and young adult-focused environmental organization. Regenesis has chapters at university and college campuses across Canada. Each university chapter is independent and democratically run.

Regenesis was founded in Toronto, Ontario, Canada, in 2007 by a group of student activists, including Claudia Rodriguez and Michael Jodah Kenny, as a youth-focused environmental organization.

Regenesis has been praised for its innovative approach of involving students in operating social enterprises and other long-term environmental initiatives.

History 
Regenesis was formed as a grassroots youth organization and aspiring student social movement focusing on environmental and related justice issues.  Campaigns and projects were determined by their membership.  The group had initial success, founding chapters at universities across Canada, including several chapters in Alberta, British Columbia and Ontario. Regenesis held a launch party that took place on World Environment Day, June 5, 2008, that was hosted by Frank De Jong, leader of the Green Party of Ontario.

Regenesis chapters currently host a variety of initiatives, including farmers' markets, borrowing centres, free stores and a community bike centre. All initiatives are open to members of the wider community.

Chapters 
Regenesis has chapters at the following post-secondary institutions: 
Concordia University
Durham College
Glendon College
McGill University
Ontario Tech University
Toronto Metropolitan University
Trent University - Main (Peterborough) Campus and Durham Campus
Université de l'Ontario français
University of Toronto
University of Toronto Mississauga
University of Toronto Scarborough
York University

References

External links
Regenesis

Environmental organizations based in Ontario
Non-profit organizations based in Toronto
Student organizations in Canada